Paragonia may refer to:

 A fictional South American country, setting of the 1916 film The Americano
 Paragonia (fly), a genus of flies
 Paragonia (plant), a genus of flowering plants